Agim Cana (born 29 September 1956) is a Kosovan former professional footballer who played as a midfielder. He represented Yugoslavia internationally at youth level.

Personal life
Cana was born in Đakovica, Yugoslavia (modern-day Gjakova, Kosovo) on 29 September 1956, to a Kosovar Albanian family. He is the father of Lorik Cana. He has Turkish citizenship.
On 2017 Cana bought Vëllaznimi's whole actions and became club's chairman.

Club career
Cana played for Prishtina, Vëllaznimi, Dinamo Zagreb, Gençlerbirliği, Samsunspor, Montreux-Sports. He was one of the golden generation players of FC Prishtina. After retiring as a player, Agim moved with his family to Switzerland in 1991, to escape the war.

References

External links
 Interview with Agim Cana  
 

Living people
1956 births
Sportspeople from Gjakova
Sportspeople from Pristina
Association football midfielders
Yugoslav footballers
Turkish people of Albanian descent
Kosovan emigrants to Turkey
FC Prishtina players
GNK Dinamo Zagreb players
Gençlerbirliği S.K. footballers
Samsunspor footballers
Yugoslav First League players
Süper Lig players
Yugoslav expatriate footballers
Yugoslav expatriate sportspeople in Turkey
Expatriate footballers in Turkey
Yugoslav expatriate sportspeople in Switzerland
Expatriate footballers in Switzerland